A gubernatorial election was held on 23 April 1955 to elect the Governor of Saga Prefecture. Incumbent Naotsugu Nabeshima defeated newcomer Genji Yoshida.

Candidates
 – incumbent Governor of Saga Prefecture, age 42
, age 41

Results

References

Saga gubernatorial elections
1955 elections in Japan